WUCP-LP (99.9 FM, "Radio 99.9 FM") is a low-powered radio station broadcasting a Religious format.  The station is licensed to the suburb of Farragut, Tennessee.  WUCP-LP first began broadcasting in 2003 under its current call sign.  The station is currently owned by Union Cumberland Presbyterian Church.

On February 19, 2009, WUCP-LP changed frequencies moving from 106.1 FM to 99.9 FM to make way for a high-power commercial station in Oliver Springs, Tennessee (WJZO). The station was issued a license to cover at 99.9 FM on May 31, 2013.

References

External links
 
 
 

UCP-LP
Radio stations established in 2002
2002 establishments in Tennessee
UCP-LP
Farragut, Tennessee